Empidinae are a subfamily of empidoid flies. They are mainly predatory flies like most of their relatives, and generally small to medium-sized. Most species are flower visitors and they can be effective pollinators.

Genera
Afroempis Smith, 1969
Allochrotus Collin, 1933
Amictoides Bezzi, 1909
Aplomera Macquart, 1838
Atrichopleura Bezzi, 1909
Bandella Bickel, 2002
Clinorhampha Collin, 1933
Cunomyia Bickel, 1998
Deuteragonista Philippi, 1865
Empidadelpha Collin, 1928
Empis Linnaeus, 1758
Gynatoma Collin, 1928
Hilara Meigen, 1822
Hilarempis Bezzi, 1905
Hilarigona Collin, 1933
Hybomyia Plant, 1995
Hystrichonotus Collin, 1933
Lamprempis Wheeler & Melander, 1901
Macrostomus Wiedemann, 1817
Opeatocerata Melander, 1928
Pasitrichotus Collin, 1933
Porphyrochroa Melander, 1928
Rhamphella Malloch, 1930
Rhamphomyia Meigen, 1822
Sphicosa Philippi, 1865
Thinempis Bickel, 1996
Trichohilara Collin, 1933

References

Empididae
Asilomorpha subfamilies